Netball South Australia is the governing body for netball in South Australia. It is affiliated to Netball Australia. It is responsible for organizing and managing the Netball South Australia Premier League as well as numerous other leagues and competitions for junior and youth teams. It is also responsible for organizing and managing two elite level representatives teams, Adelaide Thunderbirds, who compete in the Suncorp Super Netball, and Southern Force who compete in the Australian Netball League. Its headquarters are based at Netball SA Stadium.

History
Netball South Australia was formed in 1928 and was originally known as the South Australia Women's Basketball Association (SAWBA). It later became the  South Australian Netball Association (SANA).

Teams

Representative teams

Premier League clubs
The 2020 Netball South Australia Premier League featured eight clubs, entering teams in two divisions – the Premier Division and Reserves Division.

Competitions
 Netball South Australia Premier League
 Country Championships 
 Adelaide Metropolitan Netball Division 
 City Night Division

Netball SA Board 
Graeme Gilbert has served as President of the Netball SA Board since 2009. He has been a director since 2001.

Notable board members

References

External links
 Netball South Australia on Facebook
 Netball South Australia on Instagram
  Netball South Australia / Adelaide Thunderbirds on Linkedin

 
Netball
South Australia
1928 establishments in Australia